The Renova Formation is a geologic formation in Montana. It preserves fossils dating back to the Paleogene period.

See also

 List of fossiliferous stratigraphic units in Montana
 Paleontology in Montana

References
 

Paleogene Montana